Asthena ochrifasciaria is a moth in the family Geometridae. It is found in the Russian Far East, Korea and Japan.

References

Moths described in 1897
Asthena
Moths of Asia